Frederic Charles Cook (1 December 1804– 22 June 1889) was an English churchman, known as a linguist and the editor of the Speaker's Commentary on the Bible.

Life
Born at Millbrook, Hampshire, and later moved to Berkshire, he was admitted as a sizar of St John's College, Cambridge, 8 July 1824, graduated B.A. with a first class in the classical tripos in 1831, and M.A. in 1844. After leaving Cambridge he studied for a while under Barthold Georg Niebuhr at the University of Bonn. He was ordained by Charles James Blomfield in 1839, and a few years later was made her majesty's inspector of church schools.

In 1857 Cook was appointed chaplain-in-ordinary to the queen, in 1860 he became preacher at Lincoln's Inn, in 1864 canon-residentiary at Exeter Cathedral (replacing Harold Browne), and in 1869 chaplain to the bishop of London.

Cook was made precentor of Exeter Cathedral in 1872. He resigned his preachership at Lincoln's Inn in 1880. He was an invalid during the last years of his life, and died at Exeter on 22 June 1889. He left his library to the cathedral chapter.

Works
Cook issued in 1849 his Poetry for Schools. Around 1864, when the liberal theology of the Essays and Reviews and John Colenso was prominent, John Evelyn Denison suggested the Church of England reply with biblical apologetics. A commission was formed, after consultation with the bishops, which divided the Bible into eight sections, and for each section chose scholars to provide commentary. The editorship of the whole work (10 volumes), which became known as The Speaker's Commentary, was given to Cook, and it appeared 1871 to 1882.

The Apocrypha were treated separately under the editorship of Henry Wace in 1888. The Commentary came under attack: the portions by Harold Browne on the Pentateuch were criticised by Colenso, Abraham Kuenen, and others.

John Mee Fuller edited a Student's Commentary (1884) based on the work.

Cook himself was a critic of the revised New Testament, in The Revised Version of the First Three Gospels (1882). In The Origins of Religion and Language (1884), he upheld the original unity of speech. He is said to have been acquainted with 52 languages.

Family
Cook married on 2 June 1846 at St Nicholas Church, Brighton, to Jessie Barbara, daughter of Alexander Douglas McKenzie of Bursledon, Hampshire,  but left no issue. His brother-in-law was the Rev. Robert Montgomery.

Cook died at Exeter on the 22 June 1889. 

His widow died at Exeter on 5 October 1889.

Notes

Attribution

External links
 

1804 births
1889 deaths
19th-century English Anglican priests
Linguists from the United Kingdom
Alumni of St John's College, Cambridge
People from Southampton (district)